Ephebopus is a genus of northeastern South American tarantulas that was first described by Eugène Louis Simon in 1892. Its relation to other tarantulas is one of the most uncertain in the family, and it has been frequently moved around and has been placed in each of the eight subfamilies at least once.

Description
Most live in burrows, though E. murinus spends an adolescent stage living in trees. Like many other New World tarantulas, these spiders will brush urticating hairs from their bodies as a defense against potential predation. However, these spiders are unique because instead of the abdomen, these hairs are located on the pedipalps, and are removed by rubbing the palps against the chelicerae.

Diagnosis 
They can be differentiated from all other tarantulas by the urticating patch of type 5 urticating hairs, on the pedipalp femora.

Species
 it contains five species, found in Brazil, Suriname, Guyana, and French Guiana:
Ephebopus cyanognathus West & Marshall, 2000 – French Guiana
Ephebopus foliatus West, Marshall, Fukushima & Bertani, 2008 – Guyana
Ephebopus murinus (Walckenaer, 1837) (type) – French Guiana, Suriname, Brazil
Ephebopus rufescens West & Marshall, 2000 – French Guiana, Brazil
Ephebopus uatuman Lucas, Silva & Bertani, 1992 – Brazil

In synonymy 

 E. bistriatus (C. L. Koch, 1838) = Ephebopus murinus (Walckenaer, 1837)

Nomen Dubium 

 Ephebopus fossor Pocock, 1903 - Ecuador

Transferred to other genera 

 Ephebopus violaceus Mello-Leitão, 1930 → Tapinauchenius plumipes

See also
 List of Theraphosidae species

References

Theraphosidae genera
Spiders of South America
Theraphosidae